Orton Sutherland Hintz  (15 November 1907 – 18 November 1985) was a New Zealand journalist, newspaper editor, writer and fisherman. He was born in Hawera, New Zealand, on 15 November 1907.

In the 1968 New Year Honours, Hintz was appointed a Companion of the Order of St Michael and St George for services in the field of journalism.

References

1907 births
1985 deaths
New Zealand fishers
People from Hāwera
New Zealand Companions of the Order of St Michael and St George
20th-century New Zealand journalists